The gland-tailed free-tailed bat (Chaerephon bemmeleni) is a species of bat in the family Molossidae. Its natural habitats are subtropical or tropical moist montane forests, dry savanna, and caves.

Taxonomy and etymology
It was described as a new species in 1879 by Dutch zoologist Fredericus Anna Jentink. Jentink placed it in the now-defunct genus Nyctinomus, with the name Nyctinomus bemmeleni. The eponym for the species name "bemmeleni" was Dutch naturalist Adriaan Anthoni van Bemmelen, who presented the holotype to the Leyden Museum where Jentink was curator.

Description
Its dorsal fur is a dark, smokey brown while its ventral fur is a yellowish brown. Its upper lip is very wrinkled. Its tragus is very small and triangular. The males have a gular gland.

Range and habitat
It is found in several countries in West and Central Africa, including Cameroon, Democratic Republic of the Congo, Ivory Coast, Guinea, Kenya, Liberia, Rwanda, Sierra Leone, South Sudan, Sudan, Tanzania, and Uganda.

Conservation
It is evaluated as least concern by the IUCN. It meets the criteria for this designation because it has a large geographic range; its population is presumably large; its range includes protected areas; and it is not likely to be experiencing a drastic population decline.

References

Chaerephon (bat)
Bats of Africa
Fauna of Central Africa
Fauna of East Africa
Mammals of West Africa
Mammals described in 1879
Taxa named by Fredericus Anna Jentink
Taxonomy articles created by Polbot